Robert Hunter Wade is a political economy and development scholar. He has been Professor of Global Political Economy at the Department of International Development, London School of Economics since 1999.

Early life
He was born in Australia to New Zealand diplomat parents. He therefore attended numerous schools worldwide, living in British Ceylon at the age of 12. He attended university in Dunedin (BA with major in economics, Otago University, 1962–64), Wellington (BA Hons, economics, Victoria University of Wellington, 1966), and Sussex University (MPhil 1968, DPhil in social anthropology, Sussex University, 1971, thesis on irrigation systems in India).

Career
He has worked at the Institute of Development Studies (IDS), Sussex. On leave from IDS, he worked at the World Bank; the Office of Technology Assessment (US Congress) 1988; Princeton University (Woodrow Wilson School) from 1989 to 1990; MIT (Sloan School and Political Science) from 1990 to 1991. He was professor of political economy at Brown University (Watson Institute and Political Science) from 1996 to 1999 before joining the LSE in 2001. He held fellowships at the Institute for Advanced Study in Princeton, New Jersey 1992–1993, Russell Sage Foundation, New York 1997–1998, and the Institute for Advanced Study, Berlin 2000–2001. In 2011 he was the Sanjaya Lall visiting professor at Oxford University.

He also worked at the World Bank from 1984 to 1988. He has undertaken fieldwork in a range of countries including: Italy, India, Korea, Taiwan and Pitcairn Island and inside the World Bank.

In March 2022, Wade wrote a blog post claiming the 2022 Russian invasion of Ukraine was the result of Vladimir Putin falling into a "trap" set by the US and NATO,. The implication of Wade's theory (that the invasion was the result of a deliberate attempt to 'bait' Russia) is contradicted by openly-available cautions from influential American, government-affiliated think tanks. For example, the Rand Corporation, who concluded that efforts to "overextend" Russia were "impractical" and risky in a 2019 research report Extending Russia (RR 3063).

Key works 
Robert Wade is author of many books and scholarly articles including:
 Wade, Robert H. (1982), Irrigation and Politics in South Korea
 Wade, Robert H. (1988, 1994), Village Republics: The Economic Conditions of Collective Action in India
 Wade, Robert H. (1990, 2003), Governing the Market: Economic Theory and the Role of Government in East Asia's Industrialization (this won the American Political Science Association's award of Best Book or Article in Political Economy, 1992)

Awards 
In 2008, Wade received (jointly with José Antonio Ocampo) the Leontief Prize in recognition of his outstanding contribution to economic theory that addresses contemporary realities and supports just and sustainable societies. In 1992 he received the American Political Science Association's award of Best Book or Article in Political Economy. When younger he competed regularly in 10 km running races and long distance swims, and plays the classical guitar.

References

External links
Robert Wade's staff page
 

Academics of the London School of Economics
Development economists
Living people
New Zealand academics
1944 births
Brown University faculty